The enzyme methylaspartate ammonia-lyase (EC 4.3.1.2) catalyzes the chemical reaction

L-threo-3-methylaspartate  mesaconate + NH3

This enzyme belongs to the family of lyases, specifically ammonia lyases, which cleave carbon-nitrogen bonds.  The systematic name of this enzyme class is L-threo-3-methylaspartate ammonia-lyase (mesaconate-forming). Other names in common use include β-methylaspartase, 3-methylaspartase, and L-threo-3-methylaspartate ammonia-lyase.  This enzyme participates in c5-branched dibasic acid metabolism and nitrogen metabolism.  It employs one cofactor, cobamide.

Structural studies
Several structures of this enzyme have been deposited in the Protein Data Bank (linked in the infobox) which show it possesses a  TIM barrel domain.

References

 
 

EC 4.3.1
Cobamide enzymes
Enzymes of known structure